The  Lake Champlain Bridge is a vehicular bridge traversing Lake Champlain between Crown Point, New York and Chimney Point, Vermont. It replaced an older bridge that was demolished in 2009. The bridge was designed and constructed during an aggressive two-year schedule to minimize the social and economic impact of the original bridge's demolition.  It is the only fixed-link crossing of Lake Champlain/Champlain canal between US 4 in Whitehall,  to the south and US 2 at Rouses Point,  to the north.

The main arch span was prefabricated off-site in Port Henry, floated by barge to the already constructed approach spans, and then lifted into place on August 26, 2011. The completed bridge was originally scheduled to open on October 9, 2011, but was delayed due to construction delays from underwater debris and record flooding.

The bridge opened to the public on Monday, November 7, 2011, following a ribbon-cutting ceremony.

Description
After state inspectors determined that the previous Champlain Bridge was beyond repair in 2009, the states of New York and Vermont agreed to replace it. The new bridge employs a modified network tied arch design. Flatiron Constructors of Broomfield, Colorado, the U.S. subsidiary of the German firm, Hochtief AG, won the contract for the new bridge, and groundbreaking took place on June 11, 2010.  The bridge construction contract was for $69.6 million. It was completed six weeks ahead of schedule, but at a cost of $78.29 million.

Gallery

References

External links

 Lake Champlain Bridge project — official New York State Department of Transportation site
 New York State DOT Webcam monitoring progress every 15 minutes
 New York State DOT construction details

Bridges completed in 2011
Landmarks in New York (state)
Road bridges in New York (state)
Road bridges in Vermont
Tied arch bridges in the United States
Network arch bridges